Fernando Gabriel Silva Andrade (born 7 November 1996 in Santa Maria da Feira) known as Nandinho, is a Portuguese professional footballer who plays as a left back for Marítimo B.

Football career
On 2 August 2015, Nandinho made his professional debut with Feirense in a 2015–16 Taça da Liga match against Sporting Covilhã.

References

External links

Stats and profile at LPFP 

1996 births
Sportspeople from Santa Maria da Feira
Living people
Portuguese footballers
Association football defenders
Primeira Liga players
Liga Portugal 2 players
C.D. Feirense players
A.D. Sanjoanense players